Elusia is a monotypic moth genus of the family Crambidae described by William Schaus in 1940. Its only species, Elusia enalis, described in the same publication, is found in Puerto Rico.

References

Scopariinae
Crambidae genera
Monotypic moth genera
Taxa named by William Schaus